Avinoam Shalem (born 1959) is the Riggio Professor of the History of the Arts of Islam at Columbia University. He served as director of the American Academy in Rome from 2020 to 2021.

Biography 
Shalem was born in Haifa, Israel in 1959. He received his B.A. from the University of Tel Aviv, M.A. from the University of Munich before earning a PhD from the University of Edinburgh in 1995. He worked for the Khalili Collections and taught at the University of Munich prior to joining the Columbia faculty in 2013. He was also a visiting professor at Villa I Tatti, and guest professor at Clark Art Institute and Jawaharlal Nehru University. Shalem's research focuses on medieval Islamic, as well as Jewish and Christian art.

In 2020, he was appointed 24th Director of the American Academy in Rome, where he was a 2016 resident. He stepped down in fall 2021 and returned to his teaching career at Columbia.

In 2022, Shalem received a grant from the Getty Foundation to direct the Black Mediterranean project, which reconsiders the history of the relationship between Africa and Europe by shedding light on African influences on Mediterranean cultures.

References 

Living people
Israeli academics
Columbia University faculty
American Academy in Rome
Tel Aviv University alumni
Alumni of the University of Edinburgh
Ludwig Maximilian University of Munich alumni
Academic staff of the Ludwig Maximilian University of Munich
Israeli art historians
Historians of Islamic art
1959 births